Exquisite corpse is a surrealist technique.

Exquisite corpse may also refer to:

Literature
 Exquisite Corpse (magazine), edited by Andrei Codrescu
 Exquisite Corpse (novel), a 1996 novel by Poppy Z. Brite
 Exquisite Corpse, a novel by Robert Irwin
 The Exquisite Corpse, a novel by Alfred Chester

Music
 eXquisite CORpsE, a musical group related to Psychick Warriors ov Gaia
 Exquisite Corpse (album), by Daedelus
 Exquisite Corpse (EP), a 2009 EP by Warpaint
 "Exquisite Corpse" (Bauhaus song), from the album The Sky's Gone Out
 "Exquisite Corpse" (Shriekback song), from the album Sacred City
 "Exquisite Corpse" (Stephen Trask song), from the rock musical Hedwig and the Angry Inch
 "Exquisite Corpse" (George Watsky song), bonus track from the album x Infinity

Film
 Exquisite Corpse (film), a 2010 horror film